John James O'Reilly (7 October 1896 - 18 March 1942) was an Irish Gaelic footballer. His championship career at senior level with the Dublin county team spanned eleven seasons from 1919 until 1929.

Born in the North Wall area of Dublin, O'Reilly was the youngest of three sons born to John and Kate O'Reilly (née Hackett). He was educated locally and later worked as a van boy before joining the Irish army.

O'Reilly first played competitive football during a golden age for the O'Tooles club. In ten years from 1918 until 1928 he won nine county senior championship medals with the club.

Success at club level saw O'Reilly join the Dublin senior team and he made his debut during the 1918 championship. Over the course of the next decade he enjoyed much success and won three successive All-Ireland medals between 1921 and 1923. He also won four Leinster medals.

Honours
O'Tooles
Dublin Senior Football Championship (9): 1918, 1919, 1920, 1922, 1923, 1924, 1925, 1926, 1928

Dublin
All-Ireland Senior Football Championship (3): 1921, 1922, 1923
Leinster Senior Football Championship (4): 1921, 1922, 1923, 1924

References

1896 births
1942 deaths
Dublin inter-county Gaelic footballers
Irish Army officers
O'Tooles Gaelic footballers